Ingra Tor Halt railway station was located on the 10.5 mile long single track Princetown Railway in Devon, England, running from  to  with four intermediate stations. It was opened with only a basic wood platform and shelter in connection with the short-lived re-opening of the adjacent quarry.  Its later traffic was entirely walkers and it was retained in an attempt to counter competition from local bus services and encourage tourist traffic.

History
The branch line was authorised in 1878 and opened on 11 August 1883.  was the junction for the line when the halt opened, two other stations had been added to the line in the 1920s,  in 1924,  in 1936. Much of the route followed the course of the old Plymouth and Dartmoor Railway.

The freight traffic on the branch line included granite from the rail served quarries of Swelltor and Foggintor which were closed in 1906.

Owned by the Princetown Railway until 1 January 1922, the company then merged with the Great Western Railway (GWR). The line passed to British Railways (Western Region) in 1948 and closed on 3 March 1956. The track was lifted in December 1956.

Much of the old track formation now forms the route of the Dousland to Princetown Railway Track, and only the concrete base of the shelter at the halt remains.

Micro-history
At the time of the opening of the halt in 1936 the single fares were:  to Princetown, 11d First Class or 7d Second Class; to Burrator Halt, 9d and 5d; to King Tor Halt, 7d and 4d; to Dousland, 1s 1d and 7d; to Yelverton, 1s 5d and 10d; and to Plymouth, Millbay, 3s 8d and 2s 3d.  A Cheap Day Return ticket to Plymouth cost 2s 3d Third Class; or to Princetown and back for 7d.

At one time a notice at the halt stated that passengers should keep dogs on a leash due to the presence of adders.
This is now in the Plymouth Railway Circle collection and can be seen in the Lee Moor Tramway Shed which is generally opened on special event days at Buckfastleigh Station on the South Devon Railway.

Services

References
Notes

Sources
 Atterbury, P. (2006) Branch Line Britain: A Nostalgic Journey Celebrating a Golden Age. Newton Abbot : David & Charles.
 Butt, R. V. J. (1995). The Directory of Railway Stations: details every public and private passenger station, halt, platform and stopping place, past and present (1st ed.). Sparkford: Patrick Stephens Ltd. . OCLC 60251199.
 Mitchell, David (1994). British Railways Past and Present – Devon. Wadenhoe : Past and Present. .

External links

Photos of the line today
Dousland to Princetown Railway Track

Disused railway stations in Devon
Railway stations in Great Britain opened in 1936
Railway stations in Great Britain closed in 1956
Former Great Western Railway stations
1936 establishments in England